Email agent may refer to:
 An email client
 Email agent (infrastructure) various components of email infrastructure

Email